The men's Greco-Roman 60 kilograms is a competition featured at the 2007 World Wrestling Championships, and was held at the Heydar Aliyev Sports and Concert Complex in Baku, Azerbaijan on 17 September 2007.

Results
Legend
F — Won by fall
WO — Won by walkover

Finals

Top half

Section 1

Section 2

Bottom half

Section 3

Section 4

Repechage

References

Men's Greco-Roman 60 kg